William Penn High School may refer to:

William Penn High School (Delaware) in New Castle, Delaware
William Penn High School (North Carolina), High Point, North Carolina
William Penn High School (Philadelphia, Pennsylvania), Philadelphia, Pennsylvania
William Penn High School in Harrisburg, Pennsylvania, a former school building; see Harrisburg High School

See also
 Penn High School, Mishawaka, Indiana
 William Penn School (disambiguation)